Mehmet Dinçer (born 1 January 1924) is a Turkish football midfielder who was a member of the Turkey national team at the 1954 FIFA World Cup. However, he never earned a cap for his country. He also played for Fenerbahçe S.K.

References

External links
 
 

1924 births
Possibly living people
Turkish footballers
Association football midfielders
Fenerbahçe S.K. footballers
1954 FIFA World Cup players
Footballers from Istanbul